Johan Brunström and Nicholas Monroe were the defending champions, but chose not to participate together. Brunström played alongside Robert Lindstedt, but lost in the quarterfinals to Thomaz Bellucci and João Souza. Monroe teamed up with Artem Sitak, but lost in the semifinals to Juan Sebastián Cabal and Robert Farah.
Jérémy Chardy and Łukasz Kubot won the title, defeating Cabal and Farah in the final, 6–7(6–8), 6–3, [10–8].

Seeds

Draw

Draw

External Links
 Main Draw

Swedish Open - Doubles
2015 Doubles